Fredrik Gulsvik (born 29 August 1989) is a Norwegian former footballer. He played in Tippeligaen with Odd Grenland and Sandefjord, in addition to Mjøndalen before he decided to retire at the age of 22.

Club career
Gulsvik was born in Flå and began his career with local side Flå before he transferred to Spanish club UD Las Palmas. Accompanied by his mother and sister, Gulsvik stayed in Spain for four years, playing for Las Palmas and CD Maspalomas. He signed a three-year contract with Odd Grenland, then in the Tippeligaen, in 2007 and has been considered by the club to be one of their more promising players. He played for Odd's junior side until the club promoted Gulsvik to the senior team after he impressed his manager while training in Cyprus. He debuted in a 2-1 defeat to Strømsgodset on 9 April 2007.

He has become noted for possessing a powerful shot. In his inaugural season, Gulsvik converted a long-range strike against Lyn which was named goal of the year for 2007. His assistant manager, Morten Rønningen, compared him to John Carew and remarked positively on his strength and pace. Gulsvik has acquired the nickname "Super-Mac" in reference to a character that appeared in the magazine Buster.

After a spell at Sandefjord, Gulsvik joined Mjøndalen IF in 2011. He scored in debut for Mjøndalen, but that was also his only goal for the club. In July 2012 he decided to retire from professional football. He has, however, continued to play football in the lower leagues, and plays for 6th Division club Simensbråten as of 2015.

International career
Gulsvik has represented Norway at U-16, U-17, U-18, and U-19 level, scoring his first goal in a 3-1 defeat of Portugal's U-18s.

Career statistics

References

 Odd Grenland Profile, oddgrenland.no. Retrieved 2 July 2008.
 Profile: 23 Fredrik Gulsvik, tv2sporten.no. Retrieved 2 July 2008.

1989 births
Living people
People from Flå
Norwegian footballers
UD Las Palmas players
Odds BK players
Sandefjord Fotball players
Mjøndalen IF players
Eliteserien players
Norwegian First Division players
Association football forwards
Sportspeople from Viken (county)